Ksenia Yuryevna Pervak (born 27 May 1991) is a retired tennis player from Russia.

Pervak won one singles title on the WTA Tour, as well as nine singles and three doubles titles on the ITF Circuit. On 19 September 2011, she reached her best singles ranking of world No. 37. On 30 January 2012, she peaked at No. 123 in the doubles rankings.

Pervak won the 2009 Australian Open girls' singles title, defeating Laura Robson in straight sets in the final.

In November 2015, she announced her retirement from professional tennis due to chronic injuries. However, she did return to tennis briefly, playing four tournaments between September 2016 and January 2017. Her last match was a loss in the first qualifying round of the Australian Open.

Career

2009
Pervak made it to the second round of the Pattaya Open where she lost to second seed Caroline Wozniacki in three sets. She then won three qualifying matches to advance to the main draw in 's-Hertogenbosch where she defeated Czech Petra Cetkovská in the first round. Pervak also won the Australian Open junior tournament in that year, defeating Laura Robson in the final.

2010
In early February, Pervak lost in the first round of the Pattaya Open to then world No. 14, Vera Zvonareva. Pervak then reached the Malaysian Open main draw but lost to Noppawan Lertcheewakarn, in the first round. At the French Open, she reached the main draw where she lost to Maria Sharapova in the first round. At the Slovenia Open, Pervak reached her first WTA Tour semifinal against Johanna Larsson but she had to retire due to a wrist injury.

At the Guangzhou International Open, she defeated the No. 2 seed Chan Yung-jan in the first round, and reached the quarterfinals by defeating Russian compatriot Alexandra Panova, winning 24 of 27 points in the final set.

2011
Pervak kicked off her 2011 season in Brisbane, Australia, where she was seeded seventh for the qualifying draw of the Brisbane International. She defeated Jessica Moore and Alexandra Panova but was defeated by Anastasia Pivovarova in the third qualifying round. She gained entry into the main draw as a lucky loser and defeated Anna Chakvetadze in the first round, before losing in the second to Petra Kvitová.

Pervak played in the first round of the main draw of the Australian Open for the first time in her career, but lost to 13th seed and fellow Russian Nadia Petrova.

Pervak made the semifinals of the $100k event in Midland, losing to eventual champion Lucie Hradecká.
She made two consecutive quarterfinals of WTA Tour events in Memphis and Monterrey, losing to Hradecká and Gisela Dulko, respectively.

Pervak lost in qualifying at the Indian Wells Open to Jamie Hampton. However, she qualified for the Miami Open, defeating Zuzana Kučová and Junri Namigata.
She lost in the fourth round of Wimbledon to Tamira Paszek, in three sets.

2013
Pervak began her 2013 season at the Brisbane International. Coming through qualifying, she upset eighth seed Caroline Wozniacki in the first round. Her win over Wozniacki was her first victory over a top-ten player.

Grand Slam tournament performance timelines

Singles

Doubles

WTA career finals

Singles: 2 (1 title, 1 runner–up)

Doubles: 1 (runner–up)

ITF Circuit finals

Singles: 17 (9–8)

Doubles: 4 (3–1)

Junior Grand Slam finals

Singles: 1 (1 title)

References

External links

 
 
 

1991 births
Living people
Tennis players from Chelyabinsk
Russian female tennis players
Kazakhstani female tennis players
Kazakhstani people of Russian descent
Australian Open (tennis) junior champions
Grand Slam (tennis) champions in girls' singles
Naturalised citizens of Kazakhstan
Naturalised tennis players